Vassar-Warner Row is a set of historic homes located at Poughkeepsie, Dutchess County, New York. Included in the row is the Vassar-Warner Home, built in 1837 in the Greek Revival style. It is a three-story, massive brick structure with a wing designed in 1898 by Corydon Wheeler. Also in the row are three Queen Anne style residences.

It was added to the National Register of Historic Places in 1982.

References

Houses on the National Register of Historic Places in New York (state)
Greek Revival houses in New York (state)
Queen Anne architecture in New York (state)
Houses completed in 1837
Houses in Poughkeepsie, New York
National Register of Historic Places in Poughkeepsie, New York